It's a Musical World is a Canadian music television series which aired on CBC Television from 1973 to 1975.

Tommy Common and Tommy Makem took turns as series host with vocal group Sweet Majic as regulars. Episodes featured stories and folk music.

This half-hour series was broadcast for three seasons as follows:

References

External links
 

CBC Television original programming
1973 Canadian television series debuts
1975 Canadian television series endings